John Andrew Barnes III (April 16, 1945 – November 12, 1967) was a soldier of the United States Army during the Vietnam War. He was posthumously awarded the Medal of Honor for his actions during the Battle of Dak To.

Adopted as a child, Barnes joined the army after graduating from Dedham High School in 1964. After serving in the Dominican Civil War and completing a tour of duty in Vietnam, he volunteered to go back to the war. During his second tour, his unit came under attack during the Battle of Dak To. He was killed when he jumped on a grenade to save the lives of wounded comrades. For "conspicuous gallantry" that was "above and beyond the call of duty", Barnes received the Medal of Honor.

Early life and education
Barnes was born in Boston, Massachusetts on April 16, 1945. When he was two years old, he was adopted by John A. Barnes, Jr. and his wife, Katherine (née Hermes). Their 18-year-old daughter, Carson, was a freshman in college at the time.  From a young age, Barnes expressed an interest in joining the Army.

As a child Barnes lived in Belmont before moving to Dedham during his sophomore year of high school. He wanted to leave Dedham High School early to become a Marine aviator, but his parents talked him into finishing. He graduated in 1964. He was described by his sister as "an average student, quiet, and shy," as well as "very dedicated, very patriotic." While in high school, he served in the Civil Air Patrol and drilled at the South Weymouth Naval Air Station.

Career
Shortly after graduating from Dedham High School Barnes enlisted in the United States Army and went through basic training at Fort Pickett. His sister was surprised he enlisted so soon after graduation, but said he "felt determined that it was the right thing to do." Barnes also trained at the engineering school at Fort Benning. He served for a year in Santo Domingo during the Dominican Civil War.

Vietnam War
Barnes was dispatched to Vietnam as part of the 173rd Airborne Brigade on May 31, 1966, during the Vietnam War. Serving in Company C of the 1st Battalion, 503d Infantry, Barnes was assigned as a grenadier. Soldiers of the brigade became involved in Operation Attleboro in fall of 1966, an operation that started out as a small search and destroy mission north of Saigon but eventually involved 22,000 troops from 21 battalions. After serving a single tour Barnes was sent home, but volunteered to return to Vietnam and was sent back in the fall of 1967. According to Barnes' sister, his mother was very upset that he had volunteered to go back.

On November 12, 1967, while patrolling in Dak To District of Kon Tum Province during the Battle of Dak To, Barnes' unit was attacked by a North Vietnamese battalion. During the battle, Barnes manned a machine gun that had lost its crew to enemy fire and was credited with nine enemy kills. While retrieving more ammunition, Barnes dived on top of a grenade that had landed among American wounded in order to use his body to protect them from the blast. The grenade exploded, killing Barnes.

Medal of Honor
Two years later, Barnes was posthumously awarded the Medal of Honor for his actions. His parents accepted the award on his behalf from Spiro Agnew in the Vice President's executive office in Washington, D.C. Carson and her husband, James Fleming, and the oldest four of their seven children also attended. The ceremony also honored Fr. Charles J. Watters and Robert F. Stryker.

Barnes was also awarded the Bronze Star Medal, Purple Heart, and several other medals.

Citation
Rank and organization: Private First Class, U.S. Army, Company C, first Battalion, 503d Infantry 173d Airborne Brigade. Place and date: Dak To, Republic of Vietnam, November 12, 1967. Entered service at: Boston, Mass. Born: April 16, 1945, Boston, Mass.

Legacy

Barnes was buried in Brookdale Cemetery in Dedham, Massachusetts. His name is inscribed on Panel 29E – Row 084 of the Vietnam War Memorial. Carson Barnes Fleming believed that the distress of the loss of Barnes contributed to the deaths of their parents in the years that followed.

Within hours of learning that Barnes was to be awarded the Medal of Honor, a Blue Ribbon Commission was established by the Town of Dedham to make plans for a "John A. Barnes Memorial Day." The Dedham High School class of 1968 established a scholarship in his name. On April 19, 1970, The Town of Dedham rededicated Memorial Field as John A. Barnes III Memorial Park.  At the ceremony, dignitaries, V.F.W. members from dozens of towns, and local marching bands proceeded to the intersection of East Street and Eastern Ave., where a marble monument was unveiled in Barnes' honor. Among the speakers that day was Congressman James A. Burke.

A building used by the United States Navy, located at 495 Summer Street in Boston, was renovated and renamed for Barnes. The street sign on Colwell Drive also now indicates that Barnes lived there.

See also

List of Medal of Honor recipients
List of Medal of Honor recipients for the Vietnam War

Notes

References

Further reading

1945 births
1967 deaths
United States Army Medal of Honor recipients
American military personnel killed in the Vietnam War
United States Army soldiers
Vietnam War recipients of the Medal of Honor
Military personnel from Dedham, Massachusetts
Military personnel from Massachusetts
American adoptees
Burials at Brookdale Cemetery
Deaths by hand grenade
United States Army personnel of the Vietnam War